De Smedt is a Dutch occupational surname. It is East and West Flemish  for "the smith". De Smedt is common in East Flanders,  while the agglutinated form Desmedt is primarily used in West Flanders. People with this name include:

Bill DeSmedt (born 1943), American science fiction author
Charles De Smedt (1833–1911), Belgian Jesuit priest and hagiographer
Christine De Smedt (born 1963), Belgian dancer and choreographer
Eline De Smedt (born 1998), Belgian acrobatic gymnast
Felix De Smedt (1923–2012), Belgian judoka and judoka trainer
Jean-Édouard Desmedt (1926–2009), Belgian neurophysiologist
Julien De Smedt (born 1975), Belgian architect in Denmark
Larry Desmedt (1949–2004), American motorcycle builder and artist, stunt rider, and biker
Yvo G. Desmedt (born 1956), Belgian-born American cryptographer

See also
De Smet (surname), more common spelling of the surname

References

Dutch-language surnames
Surnames of Belgian origin
Occupational surnames